Les Royaumes de Borée ("the realms of Boreas") is a 2003 novel by the French writer Jean Raspail. The narrative spans from the 17th century to modern times and focuses on Oktavius-Ulrich de Pikkendorff, an officer who is appointed commander of Valduzia, a grand duchy in Karelia. Pikkendorff's task is to guard the border to the Grand North, a legendary continent located to the north of Europe. The novel is a spiritual sequel to Sept cavaliers from 1993.

The novel received the Jules Verne Prize from the Breton Academy. It was the basis for a three-volume comic-book adaptation by Jacques Terpant.

Reception
Jean-Rémi Barland of L'Express described the book as an "epic, sonorous and majestic novel". The critic wrote: "Riding on the counter-current of conformism, the novelist's heroes invest these frontiers of legend, and the plot, running over three centuries, encompasses a host of colourful characters captured in all their wild grandeur."

References

External links
 Publicity page at the publisher's website 
 Les Royaumes de Borée at the writer's website 

2003 French novels
French-language novels
Novels by Jean Raspail
Éditions Albin Michel books